The FVA-18 Primitivkrähe was a 1960s German lightweight training aircraft designed and built at Flugwissenschaftliche Vereinigung Aachen.

Design and development
The design and construction of the two-seat light aircraft was started in 1959 and it was first flown on 16 September 1965. It was a high-wing monoplane which looked similar to a primary glider, powered by a modified  Volkswagen motor car engine.

Specifications

References

Notes

Bibliography

1960s German civil utility aircraft
High-wing aircraft
Aircraft first flown in 1965